Gurdwara Nagiana Sahib is a Gurudwara, or holy Sikh shrine, located in Udoke, a small village near Batala in Punjab, India. The shrine was built by the Sikh saint Sant Baba Chuggat Singh Ji, who served as the first official Sewadar (volunteer) of the shrine.

This is a special place of worship for Nagis(Nagi clan). The Nagiana Gurudwara is Jathera of Nagis. "Jathera" is a folk religion of Punjab where one worships their ancestors or something related to their ancestors or clan. Jathera was common folk religion among Punjabis prior to Sikh religion regardless of caste. After converting to Sikh religion some Jatheras were turned into Gurudwaras.

Initially only Nagis' used to visit the Gurdwara. There is also a Nagiana Fund which has been set-up to support a number of initiatives at Nagiana Sahib - from langar sewa each year on September 8 (known as Nagi day), to supporting the weddings of under privileged girls.

Sikh Legend and Tradition 
The shrine's main building was built by Sant Baba Chuggat Singh Ji, believed to be the Gurudwara's first sewada. According to Sikh Tradition, this shrine is believed to have historical ties to Sri Guru Nanak Dev Ji.

History has led us to believe that the same Cobra that bestowed shade, followed Guru Nanak Dev Ji everywhere he went on his Udasians (travels or pilgrimages of Guru Nanak to spread God's name). During his travels, Guru Nanak Dev Ji stopped at the village Udoke and stayed in village Udoke for 9 months and 26 days, on his way to his in-laws who lived in the city of Batala. The devotee cobra was still following him - by now the cobra had reached a ripe age and was fairly old. Guru Nanak Dev Ji requested him not to follow him anymore; in lieu he should rest and dwell in Nagiana for good. Guru Nanak Dev Ji showered his blessings upon the place that whoever would visit the shrine with the true faith, their wishes shall be fulfilled.

Some people perceive Nagiana Sahib as place of worshiping snakes - this is not the case. It's a Gurdwara and Sri Guru Granth Sahib Ji takes precedence above all.

Inside the Gurdwara there's a parkash (presence) of Guru Granth Sahib Ji, in a separate room the sculptures of cobras are displayed on a podium. Miniature cobras made out of metal can be obtained from an outlet at the Gurdwara to bestow offerings in the name of Nag Ji.

Nagi Day 
It is the day to reflect on the contributions our ancestors made to our present life and the cultural, traditions and values they set for us in order to make our lives better.

According to the Vedic scriptures, an individual is born with three debts. The third debt is to one's ancestors is called ‘Pitri-rin.’ This debt is like a mortgage on one's life, but with no liability. It is an attempt to create an awareness of one's duties and responsibilities.

You do not have to believe in this because it is purely based on faith; however, you will agree that it is the responsibility of everyone to keep up the pride of the family lineage by performing actions that promote the good of all. Nagi day is nothing but a reminder of our lineage and duties towards it.

September 8 has been chosen as Nagi day as it is a very significant day for Gurdwara Nagiana Sahib and when most sangat(visitors), many from a far visit the Gurdwara – giving the opportunity to serve langar to tens of thousands.

Services Offered
The Gurdwara trust also run a number of charitable services.

 Social Responsibilities   

The trust handles social welfare responsibilities - which include, taking care of weddings for girls whom come from poor families, at no cost, in addition to supporting the village and villagers with their basic needs.

 Educational Institute

Apart from the shrine, the trust runs the educational institute / higher secondary school which is adjacent to the shrine. The gurudwara committee offers both religious study and modern education.

Charitable Hospital

The trust runs the charitable hospital for the poor and needy people of village from 2009 to till date.

Administration
The administration of the Gurdwara, is taken care by Baba Chuggat Singh Prabandhak Committee, a non-profit institution. Name of the Trust: Baba Chuggat Singh Prabandhak Committee

References

External links
Story of Nagiana Sahib in the words of Baba Kawaljit Singh Ji
Nagi Day Message - 2019 from Baba Kawaljit Singh Ji
Nagi Day Message - 2021 from Baba Kawaljit Singh Ji
Nagi Day Message - 2022 from Baba Kawaljit Singh Ji
 Guru Nanak Dev Ji

Gurdwaras in Punjab, India